ChemCatChem is a biweekly peer-reviewed scientific journal covering heterogeneous, homogeneous, and biocatalysis. It is published by Wiley-VCH on behalf of Chemistry Europe.

According to the Journal Citation Reports, the journal has a 2021 impact factor of 5.497.

References

External links 
 

Chemistry Europe academic journals
Chemistry journals
English-language journals
Wiley-VCH academic journals
Biweekly journals